This is a list of Nadir Afonso artworks: paintings, engravings, and architecture.

All data was sourced from websites (linked to) and from the books and catalogues listed in the main Nadir Afonso article.

Paintings

Titles are shown in their original language as conceived by the artist, and translated if needed, except the titles made of place names, which are shown in the English form. Multiple-source inconsistencies are shown in the Notes column. The artist's method usually involves one or more studies before the final artwork, which sometimes is revealed only years later; the artist also sometimes returns to work on artworks after they are publicly exhibited. This explains some of the multiple or alternative dates.

Early works

Expressionism

Surreal period

Iris period

Espacillimité series
All paintings in this series are independent of each other, despite their common titles.

Baroque period

Brazil period

Egyptian period

Geometry

Cities series

Women series

Unidentified

Engravings

Lithography

Lithograph is on paper and the measures are given for the printed area.

Serigraphy

All serigraphs are on paper and all measures are given for the printed area unless otherwise stated.

Others

Architecture

Own works
Projects by Nadir Afonso.

Le Corbusier
Projects by Le Corbusier, collaboration by Nadir Afonso.

Abstract art
Architecture lists